The 12 Days of Brumalia was an internet event presented by The Residents in 2004 through their website residents.com that resulted in an album of the same name. For 12 days, starting on December 25, a new song was posted on residents.com web site along with an illustration and a quote. On the 13th day, The Residents presented the epic musical work, The Feast of Epiphany.

Homer Flynn of The Cryptic Corp has stated "The Brumalia songs were a present for those who visited the site every day. It is not for those who didn't. It is not a gift for the world. Think about it, the Brumalia songs would still be on residents.com if we wished to have them shared. They should not be archived and shared."

Ralph America collected the audio track for a CD release in the summer of 2004.

The 12 Days of Brumalia was reissued in November 2014 as a compilation with Prelude to "The Teds".

Track listing 
 "Partridge Pairing"
 "Turtle Dove"
 "Chicken of the Oui"
 "Calling Bird"
 "Gold Ring"
 "Lying Goose"
 "Swami Swan"
 "Maid Being Milked"
 "Wiggling Wahines"
 "Leaping and Lords"
 "Pietà Piper"
 "Big Hand"
 "Bonus Brumalia"
 "The Feast of Epiphany"

External links
Prog Archives review

The Residents compilation albums
2004 compilation albums
Self-released albums
Ralph Records compilation albums
2004 Christmas albums